Paraconger guianensis is an eel in the family Congridae (conger/garden eels). It was described by Robert H. Kanazawa in 1961. It is a tropical, marine eel which is known from French Guiana and northern Brazil, in the western Atlantic Ocean. It is known to dwell at a depth of 73 metres.

References

Congridae
Taxa named by Robert H. Kanazawa
Fish described in 1961